Santo Krishnan, originally named Krishnan Nair, (12 May 1920 – 6 July 2013) born in Ottapalam was an Indian athlete and stuntsman. Having appeared in more than 1000 films in Malayalam, Tamil, Singala, Telugu, Kannada, Hindi and English. He died on 6 July 2013.

Career and personal life
Active in weightlifting and wrestling, Krishnan first appeared in the Tamil movie Mahaveera Bhiman (1935). Born Krishnan Nair, Santo Krishnan was married to Kochukutty Amma, who died before him in 2012. They had no children.

Death
Krishnan died on 6 July 2013 at Lakkidi, India. The cause of death was a bout of sickness he had encountered during the weeks leading to his death. He was aged 93 and was cremated near his home.

Filmography

 Meesa Madhavan
 (2002)
 Malayali Mamanu Vanakkam (2002)
 Amaram (1991)
 Njan Piranna Nattil (1985) as Mental patient
 Uyarum Njan Nadake (1985) as Moopan
 Poomadhathe Pennu (1984) as Gunda
 Hello Madras Girl (1983)
 Prathijnja (1983)
 Nagamadathu Thampuratti (1982)
 Valarthumrigangal (1981)
 Vayal (1981) as Gunda
 Ithikkarappakki (1980)
 Lava (1980)
 Light House (1976) as Velu
 Bhoomidevi Pushpiniyaayi (1974)
 Thacholi Marumakan Chantu (1970)
 Ajnaathavasam (1973)
Maravil Thirivu Sookshikkuka (1973) as Gopalan
 Azhakulla Saleena (1973)
 Police Ariyaruthu (1973)
 Rakthapushppam (1970)
 Lanka Dahanam (1970)
 Aryankavu Kollasangham (1969)
 Love In Kerala (1968)
 Maadatharuvi (1967)
 Pareeksha (1967)
 Sthanarthi Saramma (1966) as Kuriachan
 Muthalali (1965) as Watchman
 Subaidha (1965)
 Nithyakanyaka (1963)
 Puthiya Akasam Puthiya Bhoomi (1962) as Kuttan
Sampoorna Ramayanam (1958 film) as Hanuman 
 Minnunnathellaam Ponnalla (1957)
 Kundalakesi (1946)
 Sakata Yogam(1946)

References

External links
 http://www.malayalachalachithram.com/profiles.php?i=6756
Santo Krishnan at MSI

1920 births
2013 deaths
Indian stunt performers
Male actors from Kerala
Male actors in Malayalam cinema
Male actors in Tamil cinema
Male actors in Kannada cinema
Male actors in Telugu cinema
Indian male film actors
20th-century Indian male actors
21st-century Indian male actors